Eulalia Pavlovna Kadmina (1853, Kaluga —  1881, Kharkov) was a Russian singer, contralto, mezzo-soprano, dramatic actress.

Biography

Early years 
Eulalia Kadmina was born in Kaluga in the family of a Kaluga merchant Pavel Maksimovich Kadmin and a Romani person, Anna Nikolaevna. In the XIX century, such unions were considered extremely unusual. Eulalia was the youngest of the three sisters. From early childhood, she began to show a violent, very proud and independent character.

Eulalia grew up as a closed, lonely child, who did not meet at all with anyone, even with her own sisters. She learned to read early and spent all her free time reading books. The father singled it out against the background of other children, and at the age of 12 arranged for Eulalia in a prestigious educational institution   Moscow Elizabeth Institute.

The Institute was well-known for its strict discipline and high level of education. In order to prevent the young pupils from distracting from training, all the windows of the establishment were thickly smeared with chalk, so there was no way to look out onto the street. Leaving the walls of the Elizabeth Institute, girls, as a rule, became governesses. Everyone noted that they were  the wildest governess, since the presence of the man at the table led the girls into a terrible embarrassment. Girls were not adapted to life. Kadmina was already looking for a graduate of the workplace, as one meeting occurred, dramatically changed everything.

Young pupils often gave concerts for guests. Possessing a wonderful voice, Eulalia often took part in them. In 1870 Nikolai Rubinstein visited such an amateur performance. Struck by the singing of Eulalia, he persuaded her to devote herself to music and become a singer.

Nikolai Rubinshtein took an active part in the fate of the beginning singer. Despite the fact that after his father's death in the same year of 1870, Kadmina's family was left without money, he helped the girl not only become a student of the Moscow Conservatory in singing class, but also receive a scholarship.

Among the teachers of Kadmina were such honored artists as Alexandra Alexandrova-Kochetova, Ivan Samarin and Pyotr Ilyich Tchaikovsky. Later, charmed by her velvety rich mezzo-soprano, Tchaikovsky wrote specially for her music to the spring fairy tale of Alexander Ostrovsky The Snow Maiden.

At the age of eighteen, her stage debut took place. Nikolay Rubinstein invited the budding Kadminа to the role of Orpheus in the Gluck's opera Orpheus and Eurydice.

—  Eulalia, when she wanted, could be more aristocratic than all princesses. And will find a frenzy on her   it will dissolve worse than a street girl, — theatrical critic Alexander Amfiteatrov wrote about the brilliant student of the Conservatoire. Alas, she categorically did not appreciate her talent, nor the generous gift that fate gave her.

As a result, he secretly leaves, actually runs to the main country of opera in Italy.

Italy 
Cadmina sings in Naples, Turin, Florence and even in Milan, and everywhere she is invariably accompanied by a resounding success.
But here, too, she can not be saved from herself and experiences the same loneliness that burns her from within. At some point, Kadmina understands that Italy   no matter how enthusiastically she was received here   is a career impasse, a trap in which she was driven by life inexperience and ambition.

Twice Eulalia tries to commit suicide: she throws herself into the river, but the police drag her out unscathed, drink poison, but the strong body copes. Nervous, he gets sick, and then the young doctor Ernesto Falconi comes to the aid of the opera diva, who is able to cure not only her body but her soul, unfortunately, for a short while.

A young Italian makes her an offer, and she accepts it. Did the girl love him? Hardly. Most likely, she just saw in a good Italian salvation from her agonizing loneliness. But the Italian period inevitably comes to its logical conclusion. Kadmin is increasingly drawn to his homeland, but she does not want to go back to where she already had a deafening triumph. And then an invitation comes from an entertainer of the Kiev Opera House, Eulalia accepts him.

Kiev
In Kiev, her success is predictably deafening: at the premiere of the opera Aida at the Kiev Opera House, the curtain is raised 15 (!) Times encore. But after the Mariinsky Theatre and Bolshoi, this is already a clear career decline, and its consequences were not slow to manifest.

The atmosphere of the theatrical Kiev was thoroughly patchy: stuffy, shallow and mean. The theatrical public is divided into the fans of one or another opera diva, and she encounters the arrival of a new rival. Eulalia is beginning to harass in every possible way: at concerts she is booed, ordering corrupt verses from corrupt journalists.

All this painfully self-respecting Kadmina experienced very hard. And then the discord began in the family life. The Italian husband was uncomfortable in someone else's Kiev for him, besides, he was very jealous of his wife. In the end, the couple part with a scandal, and Ernesto returns to his homeland.

In Italy, Kadmina not only did not regret her voice, but also in every possible way tested it for strength. She sings whole parts not only in her natural mezzo-soprano, but also in a higher soprano. Dangerous experiments did not pass without a trace, and the singer with horror realizes that she begins to lose her voice. It would seem that the prima donna's career is over. But fate favors her and gives her a second chance.

Kharkov Theater offers Kadmina try himself on the dramatic stage. She accepts the invitation.

Kharkov 
In 1881, Kadmina passionately falls in love with an officer. A romance is breaking out. Her chosen one, who came from an impoverished noble family, soon decides to marry and looks for an advantageous party. Trying to escape from mental anguish, Kadminа plunges headlong into work.

November 4, 1881 in the Kharkov Theater put a play by Alexander Ostrovsky   Vasilisa Melentyeva.  The actress, as always, plays passionately, passionately. The atmosphere in the hall is heated to the limit. And suddenly among the spectators Kadmina sees her former lover with the bride.

Cadmina is furious, the revenge plan is immediately born in her head. During the interval Kadmina found matches in the latrine, broke off the phosphorus heads, filled them with tea and drank this mixture.

Memory 
The actress's suicide on stage caused a whole wave of responses in Russian literature. Under the influence of the tragic fate of Eulalia  Kadmina, Ivan Turgenev's novel After Death (Klara Milich), Alexander Kuprin's The Last Debut, Nikolai Leskov's Theatrical Character, Aleksey Suvorin's plays Tatiana Repina and its continuation under the same Anton Chekhov's name, Solovtsov-Fedorov's play Eulalia Radmina.

She was buried in the 1st city cemetery in Kharkov. In 1972, due to liquidation of Kharkov's 1st city cemetery, because the cemetery became totally neglected and very squalid, her remains were reburied in the 13th city cemetery in Kharkov which remains to this day. On the grave there is a modest half ruined monument with a short inscription: Eulalia Pavlovna Kadmina is a famous actress.

References

External links
Книга отражений
 Комета оперной сцены. Евлалия Кадмина отравилась во время спектакля из-за любви.
 Stanislav Sadalsky. Безумная Евлалия

1853 births
1881 deaths
19th-century opera singers from the Russian Empire
People from Kaluga
19th-century actresses from the Russian Empire
Russian stage actresses
Suicides by poison
Russian mezzo-sopranos
19th-century women musicians from the Russian Empire
1880s suicides
Suicides in Russia
Female suicides